Miroslav Klinger (20 January 1893 – 10 February 1979) was a Czech gymnast who competed for Czechoslovakia in the 1920 Summer Olympics and in the 1924 Summer Olympics. He was born and died in Prague.

In 1920 he was a member of the Czechoslovak gymnastic team which finished fourth in the team event.  Four years later at the 1924 Summer Olympics he participated in the following events:

 Individual all-around - fifth place
 Vault - seventh place
 Pommel horse - seventh place
 Parallel bars - tenth place
 Rings - eleventh place
 Sidehorse vault - twelfth place
 Rope climbing - 24th place
 Horizontal bar - 26th place
 Team all-around - did not finish

Klinger achieved greater success at the 1922 World Championships in Ljubljana where he contributed to the team gold, achieved individual gold on the Pommel Horse and Horizontal Bar, and won silver on the Parallel Bars.

Klinger was an active member and activist of Sokol organization. During World War II he was incarcerated in Dachau and Buchenwald concentration camps. In Czechoslovak parliamentary elections in 1948 he was elected to the National Assembly for the Czech National Social Party. He was a member of parliament until 1960.

References 

1893 births
1979 deaths
Czech male artistic gymnasts
Czechoslovak male artistic gymnasts
Olympic gymnasts of Czechoslovakia
Gymnasts at the 1920 Summer Olympics
Gymnasts at the 1924 Summer Olympics
Gymnasts from Prague
Buchenwald concentration camp survivors
Dachau concentration camp survivors
Czech National Social Party politicians